Out of Darkness is a 1994 American made-for-television drama film starring singer-actress Diana Ross. The movie was distributed and released by ABC on January 16, 1994, in the United States, Germany, Spain, France, Greece, Italy and Portugal.

Plot
In the film, Ross's character, named Pauline Cooper, is a former medical student who becomes ill with paranoid schizophrenia and loses 18 years of her life due to the sickness. After her release from a mental ward, Pauline returns home to live with her mother and struggles to rebuild her life with help from doctors, nurses, and a new experimental medication that will help aid her back to health but refusing to set foot in the outside world.

Enter heart of gold psychiatric worker, Lindsay Crouse who resolves to help Pauline face up to herself and what lies beyond the front door.
  
Throughout the movie, Pauline seeks to better herself in a world that she felt had shunned her.

The story is open-ended, concluding with Pauline seeing a homeless woman rummaging through junk cans and talking to herself, leaving Pauline in tears. The question of whether this will be Pauline's future or was a fate Pauline had avoided but to which she could still fall victim to was not answered, only raised.

Cast
 Diana Ross as Pauline "Paulie" Cooper
 Ann Weldon as Virginia Cooper
 Rhonda Stubbins White as Zoe Price
 Beah Richards as Mrs. Cooper
 Carl Lumbly as Addison Haig
 Chasiti Hampton as Ashley Cooper
 Maura Tierney as Meg 
 John Marshall Jones as Albert Price
 Rusty Gray as  Bartender (credited as Rusty Schmidt for the film)
 Lindsay Crouse as Kim Donaldson
 Juanita Jennings as Inez
 Patricia Idlette as Policewoman

Production
The film was rated PG-13 and rated M in Australia. The movie was made by several different production companies; these included Ross's Anaid Film Productions Inc., Andrew Delson Company, Capital Cities/ABC Video Enterprises Inc. and Empty Chair Productions Inc.

In an attempt to improvise the "walk" of a homeless indigent, Ross discreetly placed an orange between her skirted thighs and proceeded to hobble along on cue. The effort required to keep the concealed orange in place, and without using her hands, resulted in a gait so uncanny that Ross's director, Larry Elikann, later quizzed her about how she walked the "walk." But according to Ross herself, as she related to the audience of Inside the Actors Studio on February 19, 2006, she never did disclose the simplicity of her little ruse.

Awards
Ross earned a Golden Globe nomination for Best Actress – Miniseries or Television Film at the 52nd Golden Globe Awards in 1995.

References

External links
 

1994 television films
1994 films
1994 drama films
Fictional portrayals of schizophrenia
Films about schizophrenia
1990s English-language films
American drama television films
Films directed by Larry Elikann
1990s American films
English-language drama films